A sex show is a form of live performance that features one or more performers engaging in some form of sexual activity on stage for the entertainment or sexual gratification of spectators. Performers are paid either by the spectators or by the organisers of the show.

Content

A performance can include actual or simulated autoerotic acts and/or sexual activity with another performer. The performance can be in a theater style, or it can be in a peep show style. An increasingly popular form of sex show is a webcam performance in which the viewer is able to view and interact with webcam models in real time.

Sex shows are distinguished from entertainment such as striptease, pole dancing and lap dance, which do not involve sexual activity other than undressing and dancing nude or semi-nude. Sexual activity at sex shows is also distinguished from regular prostitution in that the performers usually engage in sex acts only with other performers and not with spectators or paying customers. Sex shows can overlap with other sectors of the sex industry. For example, a strip club may also offer live sex performances, and a prostitute may offer to perform sex acts with another prostitute for the gratification of a patron.

Locations
In Havana, Cuba, in the 1950s, during the second presidency of Fulgencio Batista, there were semi-legal sex shows and live pornographic theaters, such as the Shanghai Theater and the Tokyo Cabaret. The English novelist Graham Greene, writing in his autobiography Ways of Escape, described "the Shanghai Theatre where for one dollar and twenty-five cents one could see a nude cabaret of extreme obscenity with the bluest of blue films in the intervals".

During the 1960s and 1970s the Laotian capital Vientiane was famous for sex shows at ping pong show bars during the Vietnam War. Travel writer Paul Theroux described a bar in 1973 Vientiane thus: “Your eyes get accustomed to the dark and you see the waitress is naked. Without warning she jumps on the chair, pokes a cigarette into her vagina and lights it, puffing it by contracting her uterine lungs." British journalist Christopher Robbins wrote that The White Rose, a famous Vientiane bar during the war, featured floor shows in which women used their vaginas to smoke cigarettes and fling ping pong balls.

They showed live sex acts on stage, but by 2007 the Safari was the only live sex theatre left in Germany, and that closed in 2013.

In the red light district of De Wallen in Amsterdam there are three main venues for sex shows: a hostess bar called the Bananen Bar, and the Moulin Rouge and Casa Rosso theatres, which feature on-stage sex acts and variations on the ping-pong show. Casa Rosso puts on 90-minute sex shows which are made up of nine different performances. The acts include a woman smoking a cigar using her vagina, a dominatrix who humiliates a volunteer from the audience, and a couple having sex on a rotating stage. 

In Thailand, locations like Patpong in Bangkok, Walking Street, Pattaya, Bangla Road in Phuket and Ta Pae Gate in Chiang Mai have numerous venues hosting ping-pong shows. The expression "going to Bangkok" sometimes serves as a euphemism in the West for "going to a live sex show".

Legality
Sex shows are subject to varying laws such as licensing requirements and locations are subject to local zoning regulations. Some jurisdictions regard a sex show as prostitution. The content of a sex show may also be subject to national and local obscenity and other laws. Some areas allow striptease, but no sexual activity, others may allow only simulated sexual activity or autoerotic activity, while others allow anything that is legal in recorded pornography to be performed live. Generally, as of 2010, autoerotic activity is the most common legally-available kind of live sexual activity. In some cities and countries throughout the world, live sexual activity between multiple performers is legal. Webcam performances are largely unregulated.

See also

 BDSM
 Erotic dance
 Mitchell Brothers O'Farrell Theatre
 Sex club
 Stripper

References

Performing arts
Sex industry
Pornography
Erotica
Sex tourism